Honey massage is a type of soft tissue massage, where honey is poured over the area being massaged.

Depending on the technique, this type of massage can be very relaxing or slightly painful.  Prior to honey massage, a massotherapist must make sure that the patient is not allergic to honey.

The essence of this honey massage is the use of honey as a substance that has gluing qualities.  Honey is poured over the area that is being massaged, and then the massage therapist puts hands onto this area and unglues the palms.  Easy at first, "ungluing" the hands becomes more difficult with every move because the tension force increases.  Massage lasts until the palms no longer stick to the massaged area, and the honey disappears from it.  The actual duration depends on the type and quality of honey.

See also 

 Massage
 Types of massage
 Cup massage
 Vibromassage
 Hydro massage
 Cryomassage

References 
 V. Fokin, "The Complete Course of Massage", Types of Massage, 2003
Honey
H|